Dominick Barlow (born May 26, 2003) is an American professional basketball player for the San Antonio Spurs of the National Basketball Association (NBA), on a two-way contract with the Austin Spurs of the NBA G League.

High school career
Barlow played basketball for St. Joseph's Preparatory School in Philadelphia as a freshman, receiving limited playing time. After one year, he transferred to Dumont High School in his hometown of Dumont, New Jersey. Barlow assumed a leading role in his junior season and averaged 23.3 points and 12.6 rebounds per game. During his senior season, which was limited to eight games by the COVID-19 pandemic, he averaged 27.6 points, 17 rebounds, 3.1 assists and 2.6 blocks per game. Barlow was named North Jersey Player of the Year.
He played for the New York Rens at the Nike Elite Youth Basketball League, helping the team reach the Peach Jam semifinals. Barlow was a four-star recruit and intended to play a postgraduate season at Bridgton Academy in Bridgton, Maine before pursuing professional options.

Professional career

Overtime Elite (2021–2022)
On September 2, 2021, Barlow signed with Team Overtime for the Overtime Elite's inaugural season. He played for Team Overtime in OTE, averaging 14.8 points and 5.9 rebounds per game.

San Antonio Spurs (2022–present)
After going undrafted in the 2022 NBA draft, Barlow signed a two-way contract with the San Antonio Spurs. Barlow joined the Spurs' 2022 NBA Summer League roster and made his Summer League debut on July 8, 2022, scoring nine points and seven rebounds in a 90–99 loss to the Cleveland Cavaliers.

On January 28, 2023, after the Austin Spurs 126-110 loss to the Rio Grande Valley Vipers, Barlow finishes with a double-double career high game of 32 points, 10 rebounds, and 3 blocks shooting 61.9% from the field, making two out of his four 3 point shots, and three out of three free throws.

References

2003 births
Living people
American men's basketball players
Austin Spurs players
Basketball players from New Jersey
Dumont High School alumni
People from Dumont, New Jersey
Power forwards (basketball)
San Antonio Spurs players
Small forwards
Sportspeople from Bergen County, New Jersey
St. Joseph's Preparatory School alumni
Undrafted National Basketball Association players